"Show Me the Way" is a 1996 song by German Eurodance group Mr. President, released as the third and last single from their second album, We See the Same Sun (1996). It was a moderate hit in Europe, peaking at number 11 in Denmark, number 18 in Austria, number 19 in Finland, number 21 in Switzerland and number 28 in Germany. The CD single also includes the song performed with a Philharmonic Orchestra. The music video was directed by John Buche, and shows the members of the group in a Casino. Buche also directed the music videos for "Coco Jamboo" and "I Give You My Heart". The beat to "How Deep Is Your Love" by Bee Gees was merely sampled for a small portion of the song.

Track listing

Charts

References

 

1996 singles
1996 songs
Mr. President (band) songs
Warner Records singles